The following are the national records in Olympic weightlifting in Croatia. Records are maintained in each weight class for the snatch lift, clean and jerk lift, and the total for both lifts by the Croatian Weightlifting Federation (Hrvatski dizački savez).

Current records

Men

Women

Historical records

Men (1998–2018)

Women (1998–2018)

References
General
 Croatian records 24 September 2022 updated
Specific

External links
 Croatian Weightlifting Federation website

Croatia
Olympic weightlifting
weightlifting